Lilimar Hernandez (born June 2, 2000), also known mononymously as Lilimar, is an American actress. She is known for her roles as Sophie in the 2015–2016 Nickelodeon television series Bella and the Bulldogs, as Sage in the 2018–2019 Nickelodeon television series Knight Squad, and as the titular protagonist of the Peacock animated television series Cleopatra in Space, which she called her "first big show".

Early life and family
Hernandez was born in Margarita Island, Venezuela, to Cuban parents. She moved to Miami with her family when she was six years old, and began taking acting classes at the age of nine. Since she got her role in Bella and the Bulldogs, she lives in Los Angeles with her grandmother and with her mother, Mayte.

Hernandez also has heterochromia, with her left eye being brown and her right eye being green/hazel.

Career 
At age 14, Hernandez starred in the short film Pedro Pan depicting Operation Pedro Pan, which relocated more than 14,000 Cuban children to the United States from 1960 to 1962. Her first major role was as Sophie in the 2015–2016 Nickelodeon television series Bella and the Bulldogs. In 2017 she joined the cast of the 2018–2019 Nickelodeon series Knight Squad. In 2019 she was cast in the lead role of Cleopatra in the Peacock animated series Cleopatra in Space, for which she also sings the theme song.

Filmography

Awards and nominations

References

External links 
 
 

2000 births
Living people
21st-century American actresses
Actresses from Miami
American child actresses
American television actresses
American voice actresses
American people of Cuban descent
Hispanic and Latino American actresses
Venezuelan people of Cuban descent
Venezuelan emigrants to the United States